Ravil Midekhatovich Gusmanov (born July 25, 1972) is a Russian former professional ice hockey left winger, formerly of Metallurg Magnitogorsk and Traktor Chelyabinsk in the Kontinental Hockey League.

He was drafted in the fourth round, 93rd overall, of the 1993 NHL Entry Draft by the Winnipeg Jets, and he played in four National Hockey League games with the Jets, going scoreless.

Career statistics

Regular season and playoffs

International

External links

1972 births
Living people
Chicago Wolves (IHL) players
Houston Aeros (1994–2013) players
Ice hockey players at the 1994 Winter Olympics
Indianapolis Ice players
Metallurg Magnitogorsk players
Olympic ice hockey players of Russia
People from Naberezhnye Chelny
Russian ice hockey left wingers
Saint John Flames players
Springfield Falcons players
Tatar people of Russia
Tatar sportspeople
Traktor Chelyabinsk players
Winnipeg Jets (1979–1996) draft picks
Winnipeg Jets (1979–1996) players
Sportspeople from Tatarstan